Eilen Jewell (born April 6, 1979) is an American singer-songwriter from Boise, Idaho. She has released seven albums.

Early life and education
Jewell grew up in Boise, Idaho and attended St. John’s College in Santa Fe, New Mexico. After living in Boston for several years, she returned to Boise in 2015. Her 2015 album, Sundown Over Ghost Town, was largely inspired by her return to Boise.

Career
Jewell began her musical career busking on the streets of Santa Fe while attending college. She then moved to Los Angeles and performed on the streets of Venice Beach. Jewell moved to Massachusetts where she performed at local music clubs.

In December 2005, Jewell recorded a "live demo" album called Nowhere in Time and later recorded the album Boundary County with Jason Beek on percussion, Daniel Kellar on violin, Jerry Glenn Miller on guitars and Johnny Sciascia on upright bass.

Her album Letters from Sinners & Strangers, was recorded at the Signature Sounds studio in Pomfret, Connecticut.

In early 2009 Jewell released the album Sea of Tears which was called a "startling departure"  by a Sydney Morning Herald music critic.

In 2010, Jewell released the album Butcher Holler, an album of Loretta Lynn covers and in 2011, her fourth album of original music, Queen of the Minor Key.

Jewell and her band toured the U.S., Canada, Europe, the UK and Australia beginning in 2005 including performances at South by Southwest and NPR's World Cafe.

Discography
 Boundary County (2006)
 Letters from Sinners & Strangers (2007)
 Heartache Boulevard (2007) EP
 The Sacred Shakers (The Sacred Shakers) (2008)
 Sea of Tears (2009)
 Butcher Holler:  A Tribute To Loretta Lynn (2010)
 Queen of the Minor Key (2011)
 Live (The Sacred Shakers) (2014)
 Live at The Narrows (2014) 2CD
 Sundown Over Ghost Town (2015)
 Down Hearted Blues (2017)
 Gypsy (2019)

Notes and references

External links
 

1979 births
Living people
American women country singers
American country singer-songwriters
American women singer-songwriters
American street performers
Torch singers
Musicians from Boise, Idaho
Country musicians from Idaho
St. John's College (Annapolis/Santa Fe) alumni
21st-century American singers
21st-century American women singers
Signature Sounds artists
Singer-songwriters from Idaho